Sigurður Jónsson (23 July 1924 – 13 March 2003) was an Icelandic swimmer. He competed in the men's 200 metre breaststroke at the 1948 Summer Olympics.

References

External links
 

1924 births
2003 deaths
Sigurdur Jonsson
Sigurdur Jonsson
Swimmers at the 1948 Summer Olympics